Rubber is the third solo album by former Guns N' Roses guitarist Gilby Clarke, released in 1998.

Track listing
All music and lyrics are written by Gilby Clarke, except where noted
 "Kilroy Was Here" – 2:55
 "The Haunting" – 2:57
 "Something's Wrong With You" – 3:38
 "Sorry I Can't Write A Song About You" – (Words by Clarke, Jonathan Daniel) – 3:38
 "Mercedes Benz" (Janis Joplin, Michael McClure, Bobby Neuwirth) – 3:41
 "The Hell's Angels" – 2:41
 "Saturday Disaster" (Words by Clarke, Daniel) – 2:59
 "Trash" (Sylvain Sylvain, David Johansen) – 2:48
 "Technicolour Stars" – 3:17
 "Superstar" – 1:48
 "Bourbon Street Blues" (Music by Clarke, Jo Almeida) – 2:33
 "Frankie's Planet" – 3:04

Personnel

Gilby Clarke – vocals, guitars, bass
Ryan Roxie – guitars
Bobby Schneck – guitars
Michael Brooks – guitars, vocals
Chris Derry – guitars, vocals
James LoMenzo – bass
Will Effertz – bass, background vocals
Phil Soussan – bass
Carson Sumner – bass
Johnny Griparic – bass
Teddy Andreadis – Hammond organ, piano, accordion
Brian Tichy – drums, vocals
Mike Fasano – drums
Eric Singer – drums, background vocals
Ulysses S. Davidson - snare drums
Winston Watson III – drums
Luc Benson – drums
Jack Riley – background vocals
Brian Smith – background vocals, tambourine
Eric Stevens - bass

References

Gilby Clarke albums
1998 albums